All Eyes on Me may refer to:

 "All Eyes On Me" (song), 2014 single by South African rapper AKA
 "All Eyes on Me", 1998 song from the album Dizzy Up the Girl by the Goo Goo Dolls
 "All Eyes on Me", 2006 song from the album LeToya by LeToya Luckett
 "All Eyes on Me", 2007 song from the album Food by Zico Chain
 "All Eyes on Me", 2009 song from the album Til the Casket Drops by Clipse, featuring Keri Hilson
 All Eyes on Me, 2018 extended play release by Conro 
 "All Eyes on Me", 2021 song from the soundtrack Inside (The Songs) by Bo Burnham, also featured in the film Bo Burnham: Inside

See also
 All Eyez on Me (disambiguation)
 All Eyes (disambiguation)
 Eyes on Me (disambiguation)